Jafar Irismetov (born 23 August 1976) is a former Uzbekistan footballer and coach.

Playing career
On 29 December 2012 IFFHS published list of The World's most successful Top Division Goal Scorer among the still active Players. Jafar Irismetov ranked 8th in list, scoring 240 goals in 441 matches in his career.

After 2012 season played for Navbahor Namangan he decided to finish his playing career. Early in 2013 he announced to play beach soccer and participated in 2013 FIFA Beach Soccer World Cup qualification of (AFC) for Uzbekistan. He scored 5 goals in tournament. On 23 March 2015 in 2015 AFC Beach Soccer Championship in Qatar, Irismetov made hat-trick in group stage match against UAE which ended by 6–5 win of uzbek side.

International
He played 36 matches and scored 15 goals for the Uzbekistan between 1997 and 2007.

Managing career
Irismetov started managing career in 2014. In January 2014 he was named as head coach of NBU Osiyo, club in Uzbekistan First League. On 31 May 2014 he resigned his post and left the club.

In January 2016 he joined coaching stuff of Oqtepa.

Honours

Club
Dustlik
Uzbek League (1): 2000
Uzbek Cup (1): 2000

Spartak Moscow
Russian Football Premier League (1): 2001
Commonwealth of Independent States Cup (1): 2001

Pakhtakor
Uzbek League (1): 2003

Kayrat Almaty
Kazakhstan Premier League (1): 2004

Almaty
Kazakhstan Cup (1): 2006

Liaoning FC
China League One: 2009

Individual
Uzbekistan Footballer of the Year: 2000
Uzbekistan Footballer of the Year 2nd: 1997
Uzbek League Top Scorer (3): 1996, 1997, 2000
CIS Cup top goalscorer: 2001 (shared)
Kazakhstan Premier League Top Scorer (2): 2006, 2007
Gennadi Krasnitsky club member: 203 goals

References

External links

Irismetov goals in 2006 - Myspace

1976 births
Living people
Uzbekistani footballers
Association football forwards
Uzbekistan international footballers
Uzbekistani expatriate footballers
Expatriate footballers in Greece
Expatriate footballers in Russia
Expatriate footballers in Belarus
Expatriate footballers in Ukraine
Expatriate footballers in Kazakhstan
Expatriate footballers in China
Uzbekistani expatriate sportspeople in Greece
Uzbekistani expatriate sportspeople in Russia
Uzbekistani expatriate sportspeople in Belarus
Uzbekistani expatriate sportspeople in Ukraine
Uzbekistani expatriate sportspeople in Kazakhstan
Uzbekistani expatriate sportspeople in China
Russian Premier League players
Ukrainian Premier League players
Kazakhstan Premier League players
China League One players
FC Dustlik players
Panathinaikos F.C. players
FC Chernomorets Novorossiysk players
FK Dinamo Samarqand players
FC Spartak Moscow players
FC Slavia Mozyr players
FC Anzhi Makhachkala players
Pakhtakor Tashkent FK players
FC Kryvbas Kryvyi Rih players
FC Kairat players
FC Aktobe players
FK Andijon players
Liaoning F.C. players
FC Shurtan Guzar players
Navbahor Namangan players